The 26th Los Angeles Film Critics Association Awards, honoring the best in film for 2000, were given in December 2000.

Winners

Best Picture:
Crouching Tiger, Hidden Dragon (Wo hu cang long)
Runner-up: Wonder Boys
Best Director:
Steven Soderbergh – Erin Brockovich and Traffic
Runner-up: Ang Lee – Crouching Tiger, Hidden Dragon (Wo hu cang long)
Best Actor:
Michael Douglas – Wonder Boys
Runner-up: Javier Bardem – Before Night Falls
Best Actress:
Julia Roberts – Erin Brockovich
Runner-up: Laura Linney – You Can Count on Me
Best Supporting Actor:
Willem Dafoe – Shadow of the Vampire
Runner-up: Benicio del Toro – Traffic
Best Supporting Actress:
Frances McDormand – Almost Famous and Wonder Boys
Runner-up: Zhang Ziyi – Crouching Tiger, Hidden Dragon (Wo hu cang long)
Best Screenplay:
Kenneth Lonergan – You Can Count on Me
Runner-up: Steve Kloves – Wonder Boys
Best Cinematography:
Peter Pau – Crouching Tiger, Hidden Dragon (Wo hu cang long)
Runner-up: Steven Soderbergh – Traffic
Best Production Design:
Tim Yip – Crouching Tiger, Hidden Dragon (Wo hu cang long)
Runner-up: Don Taylor – The House of Mirth
Best Music Score:
Tan Dun – Crouching Tiger, Hidden Dragon (Wo hu cang long)
Runner-up: Björk – Dancer in the Dark
Best Foreign-Language Film:
Yi Yi • Taiwan/Japan
Runner-up: Girl on the Bridge (La fille sur le pont) • France
Best Non-Fiction Film:
Dark Days
Runner-up: The Life and Times of Hank Greenberg
Best Animation:
Chicken Run
New Generation Award:
Mark Ruffalo – You Can Count on Me
Career Achievement Award:
Conrad L. Hall
Special Citation:
Charles Champlin

References

External links
 26th Annual Los Angeles Film Critics Association Awards

2000
Los Angeles Film Critics Association Awards
Los Angeles Film Critics Association Awards
Los Angeles Film Critics Association Awards
Los Angeles Film Critics Association Awards